Onigam Lake is a lake in the Hudson Bay drainage basin in Unorganized Kenora District in Northwestern Ontario, Canada. The Sturgeon River flows via the Echoing River and the Hayes River to Hudson Bay.

See also
List of lakes in Ontario

References

Lakes of Kenora District